Radio Taíno is a Cuban Spanish language radio station.

Taíno Radio Station, the tourism radio station of Cuba, broadcasts 24 hours a day from Radio Center Havana.

History and details 
The station was founded on November 3, 1985 and was popularly known as "Cuba's tourist station", with content aimed at foreign visitors who came to the country as tourists, diplomatic missions and businesses.

Already in the 1990s of the twentieth century, Radio Taíno's programming modernized its style and to guarantee a wider coverage they decided that the English language should be present.

On Radio Taino there is a considerable presence of Cuban music, although songs from the Latin American, Caribbean or Anglo-Saxon repertoire are also broadcast. And in the case of the locution, a colloquial, direct, soft cadence language is essential.

Programming

References

External links
 Radio Taíno online 

Taino
Radio stations in Cuba
Radio stations established in 1985